The League of Lords was an opposition group of feudal nobles dissatisfied with the rule of Wenceslaus IV of Bohemia, Holy Roman Emperor and King of Bohemia. Lasting from 1394 to 1405, the goal of its members was to provide mutual support and gain co-government in the country.

History
The League began to form in the spring of 1394. Members were bothered not only by the manner of Wenceslaus' rule, but also by his preferential treatment of the lower nobility. The founding members were Henry III of Rosenberg, Jindřich the Elder of Hradec, Vilém III of Landštejn, Otto III of Bergau, Břeněk of Skála, Jindřich Berka of Hohenštejn, Boreš the Younger of Bečov and Rýzmburk, and Boček II of Poděbrady. They were allied with Margrave Jobst of Moravia.

After the murder of John of Nepomuk in 1393, Jobst of Moravia lead an uprising against Wenceslaus. On 8 May 1394, the League managed to capture Wenceslas in Králův Dvůr. Jobst was named as regent of the kingdom. However, John of Görlitz, Wenceslaus' half-brother, managed to raise an army of crown loyalists and negotiated the king's release on August 1, 1394. The League continued to operate against the crown. In 1395, troops led by Henry III of Rosenberg attacked the royal properties of Kuglvajt, Vodňany, and České Budějovice. John of Görlitz and Sigismund of Bohemia continued to mediate disputes. On May 31, 1396, Wenceslaus briefly arrested Margrave Jobst and six members of the League.

The League grew increasingly discontent with members of the lower nobility acting as advisors to the king. On 11 June 1397, four of Wenceslaus' advisors were assassinated at Karlštejn, as orchestrated by John II, Duke of Opava-Ratibor. John was able to convince Wenceslaus that the murdered were conspiring against the crown and went unpunished.

In 1401, the League of Lords supported Sigismund of Bohemia in his claim for the throne. On 29 June 1402, Sigismund captured Wenceslaus and took him to Vienna, where he remained imprisoned for more than a year before he managed to escape with the help of John II of Liechtenstein. In 1405, Wenceslaus, still titular King of Bohemia, and the League reached a settlement. Wenceslaus appointed more members of the high nobility to important positions, however, the king continued to decide for himself the composition of the royal council, including appointing members of the lower nobility.

References

Bohemian nobility